Associação Académica de Coimbra, Rugby is one of the leading teams of rugby union in Portugal. It is currently one of Portugal's top 8 clubs and plays in the Super Bock above the 1st Division. The club is one of the most successful of the sports sections of the Associação Académica de Coimbra, and is based at the same Estadio Municipal as the fully independent football team.

The club was founded in 1936 and won the Campeonato Português de Rugby in 1977, 1979, 1997 and 2004, and the Portuguese Rugby Cup in 1974, 1980, 1990, 1995, 1996 and 1997.

References

External links

 AAC Secção de Rugby (official website)

Direito
University and college sports clubs in Portugal